Truck classifications are typically based upon the maximum loaded weight of the truck, typically using the gross vehicle weight rating (GVWR) and sometimes also the gross trailer weight rating (GTWR), and can vary among jurisdictions.

United States
In the United States, commercial truck classification is determined based on the vehicle's gross vehicle weight rating (GVWR). The classes are numbered 1 through 8. Trucks are also classified more broadly by the Federal Highway Administration (FHWA), which groups classes 1 and 2 as light duty, 3 through 6 as medium duty, and 7 and 8 as heavy duty. The Environmental Protection Agency (EPA) has a separate system of emissions classifications for trucks. The United States Census Bureau also assigned classifications in its now-discontinued Vehicle Inventory and Use Survey (VIUS) (formerly Truck Inventory and Use Survey (TIUS)).

United States federal law requires drivers to have a commercial driver's license (CDL) to operate heavy-duty vehicles (Class 7 and 8) in commerce, with the exception of emergency vehicles and vehicles strictly used for recreational and/or agricultural purposes, though it allows states to require a CDL for these vehicles under their discretion. A CDL is also required to operate any vehicle that transports at least 16 passengers (including the driver) or hazardous materials requiring placards under federal and state law regardless of the weight of the vehicle.  States may extend CDL requirements for additional vehicles, for example, New York requires a CDL to operate a stretched limousine and California requires a CDL for any vehicle with three or more axles that has a gross vehicle weight rating of over 6,000 pounds.

Table of US GVWR classifications

Notes on weight classes

"Ton" rating
When light-duty trucks were first produced in the United States, they were rated by their payload capacity in tons:  (1000 pounds),  (1500 pounds) and 1-ton (2000 pounds). Ford had introduced the "One-Tonner" in 1938 to their line of trucks. The "Three-quarter-tonner" appeared in the Ford truck lineup in 1939. Over time, payload capacities for most domestic pickup trucks have increased while the ton titles have stayed the same. The 1948 Ford F-1 had a Gross Vehicle Weight Rating (GVWR) of 4700 pounds. The truck was marketed with a "Nominal Tonnage Rating: Half-Ton." The actual cargo capacity had increased to 1450 pounds. Ford adopted this promotional nomenclature in 1948 to assist buyers, sellers, and users. The now-imprecise ton rating has continued since the post World War II era to compare standard sizes, rather than actual capacities. In 1975, a change in U.S. emission laws required any vehicle under 6000 pounds GVWR to burn unleaded fuel. U.S. pickup truck manufacturers responded with a "heavy half" pickup of over 6000 pounds GVWR. The F-150 had a capacity of over 2000 pounds, compared to 1500 pounds for the F-100.

This has led to categorizing trucks similarly, even if their payload capacities are different. The Chevrolet Silverado/GMC Sierra 1500, Ford F-150, Nissan Titan, Ram 1500, and Toyota Tundra are called "half-ton" pickups (-ton). The Chevrolet Silverado/GMC Sierra 2500, Ford F-250, and Ram 2500 are called "three-quarter-ton" pickups. The Chevrolet Silverado/GMC Sierra 3500, Ford F-350, and Ram 3500 are known as "one ton" pickups.

Similar schemes exist for vans and SUVs (e.g. a 1-ton Dodge Van or a -ton GMC Suburban), medium duty trucks (e.g. the 1-ton Ford ) and some military vehicles, like the ubiquitous deuce-and-a-half.

Class 8

The Class 8 truck gross vehicle weight rating (GVWR) is a vehicle with a GVWR exceeding  . These include tractor trailer tractors, single-unit dump trucks of a GVWR over 33,000 lb, as well as non-commercial chassis fire trucks; such trucks typically have 3 or more axles. The typical 5-axle tractor-trailer combination, also called a "semi" or "18-wheeler", is a Class 8 vehicle.  Standard trailers vary in length from  containers to  van trailers, with the most common length being the  trailer.  Specialized trailers for oversized loads can be considerably longer.  Commercial operation of a Class 8 vehicle in the United States requires either a Class-B CDL for non-combination vehicles, or a Class-A CDL for combination vehicles (tractor-trailers).

Canada

Vehicle classifications vary among provinces in Canada, due to "differences in size and weight regulations, economic activity, physical environment, and other issues". While several provinces use their own classification schemes for traffic monitoring, Manitoba, Ontario, Prince Edward Island and Saskatchewan have adopted the 13-class system from the United States' Federal Highway Administration—sometimes with modifications, or in Ontario's case, for limited purposes. British Columbia and Ontario also distinguish between short- and long-combination trucks.

European Union and United Kingdom
Vehicle categories on a European driving licence include (among others) B for general motor vehicles, C for large goods vehicles, D for large passenger vehicles (buses), and are limited by the Gross Vehicle Weight Rating and number of passenger seats.

The general categories are further divided as follows:
 appending the number 1 to the licence class C or D denotes the "light" versions of said class (e.g., Minibus, or medium truck).
 appending the letter E allows for trailers of larger Gross Trailer Weight Rating (GTWR) than permitted by the standard licence category.

For the "trailer" categories, a separate driving test is generally required (e.g., "C", and "CE" require separate tests).

The classifications used on the International Driving Permit are similar to the European model.

The licence categories that deal with trucks are B and C:

List of truck types
Truck (Lorry) See List of truck types

Box truck
Cab over
Chassis cab
Concrete mixer
Conversion van
Dump truck
Flatbed truck
Fire truck
Logging truck
Panel van
Platform truck
Pickup truck
Refuse truck
Semi tractor
Sport utility vehicle
Tow truck
Van

Gallery

See also

Car classification
Corporate Average Fuel Economy (CAFE)
Commercial vehicle
Curb weight
Driver's license
Fifth wheel
Gross weight:
Gross axle weight rating (GAWR)
Gross combined weight rating (GCWR)
Gross trailer weight rating (GTWR)
Gross vehicle weight rating (GVWR)
Large goods vehicle
List of truck types
Semi-trailer 
Tow hitch
Trailer
Vehicle category

References

External links
 Reducing CO2 emissions from Heavy-Duty Vehicles (European Union)
 Führerscheinklassen (Klassen der Lenkberechtigung)  (trans.: Driving license classes)

Classification
Vehicle law
Vehicle classification